Pump It Up is a British game show for children that was produced by Carlton Television broadcast on CITV from 26 February 1999 to 31 March 2000. Andy Collins was the host and was joined by Julia Bradbury in the first series and Fearne Cotton in the second series. Voiceovers were provided by Richard Webb.

Series overview

References

External links
 
 
 

1999 British television series debuts
2000 British television series endings
British children's game shows
1990s British game shows
2000s British game shows
ITV children's television shows
Carlton Television
Television series by ITV Studios
English-language television shows